Sébastien Serge Hidalgo (born 11 January 1978 in Melun) is an amateur French Greco-Roman wrestler in the men's lightweight category. He is a member of US Métro Paris, and is coached and trained by Patrice Mourier.

At age thirty, Hidalgo made his official debut for the 2008 Summer Olympics in Beijing, where he competed in the men's 60 kg class. He received a bye for the second preliminary round, before losing out to former Olympic silver medalist Roberto Monzón of Cuba, with a technical score of 4–11.

References

External links
Profile – International Wrestling Database
Profile – French Olympic Profile 
NBC Olympics Profile

French male sport wrestlers
1978 births
Living people
Olympic wrestlers of France
Wrestlers at the 2008 Summer Olympics
Sportspeople from Melun
20th-century French people
21st-century French people